Jennings is an unincorporated area and census-designated place (CDP) in Garrett County, Maryland, United States. At the 2010 census, the population was 113.

Water runoff from Jennings flows through the Casselman River north then west to the Youghiogheny River, then to the Monongahela, Ohio, and Mississippi rivers, before flowing to the Gulf of Mexico.

Demographics

History 
The founding of Jennings began in 1899 when prosperous entrepreneurs, brothers Cortez H. Jennings and B. Worth Jennings from Towanda, Pennsylvania, launched their project to harvest the old growth forest between Grantsville and Bittinger in Garrett County, Maryland. The brothers purchased a few dozen parcels of land.  They referred to these lands collectively as Maynadier Lands and Cunningham Lands, which altogether encompassed 10 square miles (26 square km). 

Harvesting the timber necessitated that the Jennings brothers create infrastructure.  They built a railroad with multiple spurs throughout their land, a sawmill, a hotel, a general store, and provided land for two schools and a church.  They hired local men for labor, and they arranged for Hungarian immigrants experienced in the timber trades to relocate to Jennings.  They named their new town Jennings.

In addition to their project in Maryland, the brothers launched a similar enterprise in Tucker County, West Virginia, which created the town of Jenningston.  In 1906, B. Worth Jennings, age 44, died from a gunshot wound sustained at Jenningston.

As the timber was harvested in Maryland, Cortez Jennings sold numerous parcels of land to local folks, many of whom proceeded to farm the land and raise a family.  

In 1920, Cortez Jennings drove from his home in Towanda, Pennsylvania, to Jennings where he became incapacitated by a stroke. He was taken back to Towanda where he died.  In 1925, the heirs of the Jennings brothers sold the residue of their numerous enterprises and lands in and around Jennings to William A. Morgart.

Morgart opened a series of coal mines along the eastern bank of the South Branch Casselman River.  He used his railroad to haul the coal.  William and his wife Rosalie lived in the largest house in Jennings, and they shared it with their son Louis A. Morgart and his wife Lillian.  

William Morgart died in 1944.  Responsibility for the management of his businesses and real estate passed to Louis. Louis died in 1951.  The last of the coal mines closed a few years later.

References 

Census-designated places in Garrett County, Maryland
Census-designated places in Maryland